The London Midland and Scottish Railway and its successor British Railways built 52 express passenger steam locomotives with a pacific 4-6-2 wheel arrangement.  These were to four classes - the LMS Princess Royal Class (1933-1935), LMS Turbomotive, later rebuilt as Princess Anne, and the LMS Coronation Class (1937-1948).  All were built at Crewe Works.  They were used principally on express passenger trains on the West Coast Main Line between Euston and Glasgow.

Overview

Technical comparison

Preservation 
Two Princesses and three Duchesses have been preserved.

See also 
 LNER Pacifics

London, Midland and Scottish Railway locomotives
4-6-2 locomotives
Standard gauge steam locomotives of Great Britain